Attiki Odos is a privately owned toll motorway system in Greece. The Attiki Odos motorways form the outer beltways of the Greater Athens metropolitan area. The Attiki Odos system consists of the following motorways:
 A6: Eleusis - Athens International Airport 
 A61: Markopoulo - Lavrio (planned)
 A62: Koropi - Athens International Airport 
 A63: Ilioupoli - Paiania (planned)
 A64 (Ymittos Ring): Katechaki Avenue - Pallini (extension planned)
 A65 (Aigaleo Ring): Aspropyrgos industrial area - Ano Liosia 
 A642: Doukissis Plakentias Avenue - Agia Paraskevi

History
Construction of the A6 motorway began in 1996. Part of it was opened, along with the Eleftherios Venizelos International Airport to which it connects, in March 2001. 

In early 2003, the A6 was opened from Kifisias Avenue Interchange to Eleftherios Venizelos Airport; the Ymittos Ring was almost paved by this time, and tunnels were already complete. On 3 September 2003, the Ymittos Ring opened. This part of the motorway runs in the northern part of the Hymettus hills and bypassed Mesogeion Avenue and linked to Kifissou Avenue and its suburbs, and the Airport along with the eastern suburbs of Athens.

In November 2003, the western part opened from the junction with Motorway 8 to Kifisias Avenue. In April 2004, a small 2.5 km section opened, connecting the Ymittos Ring to the westbound direction of the A6.

Safety
Attiki Odos is considered one of the safest motorways in Europe. Its design used strict safety-related technical specifications, including updated hard shoulders in both directions and high quality skid-resistant asphalt pavement, dense lighting and fencing. Attiki Odos has hundreds of CCTV cameras connected to the Traffic Management Centre (TMC), which detects any incidents occurring on the motorway and informs the intervention and maintenance patrol units to provide assistance. Other sophisticated safety systems include:

 Road pavement sensors
 Carbon monoxide measurement systems installed in tunnels
 TETRA system for communication with the patrol units
 Electronic variable message signs
 Automatic tunnel ventilation systems

Tolls
Toll stations are located at the interchanges leading to the Attiki Odos motorway; the toll is paid when entering the motorway. The toll is the same regardless of the length of journey, but depends on vehicle category. Drivers can pay by either cash, e-pass or a special account card.
Recently credit card payments have also been introduced.

Expansion plans
In 2001, the same year the first section of the motorway was delivered, the discussion about the extension of the motorway first opened, but the plans remained unimplemented for many years.

On October 21, 2005 a new expansion plan was proposed. 76 km of motorway was to be constructed, bringing the total length to 141 km. Extensions were to be constructed towards Rafina, Lavrio and Vouliagmeni. The Hymettus Beltway was also to be extended southwards to Vouliagmeni, in the area of Elliniko. In 2010 and 2013 alterations in the original planning were made and more extensions were proposed.

As of 2019, the expansion plan under discussion includes the extensions to Rafina and Lavrio ports, the extension of Kymis Avenue up to the A1 motorway, the extension of Hymettus western ring road to Vouliagmenis Avenue, as well as the extension of Suburban Railway to Lavrio, but these projects have not begun construction yet.

References

External links
The official website of Attiki Odos S.A.
Previous projects on Attiki Odos

Motorways in Greece
Ring roads in Greece
Toll roads in Greece
Transport in Athens
Roads in Attica